is a former Japanese politician of the now defunct People's New Party, and was a member of the House of Councillors in the Diet (national legislature). Jimi is a registered medical practitioner, and was a graduate of the department of medicine at Kyushu University in 1977. He was elected to the House of Councillors 2007, after serving more than 20 years in the House of Representatives of Japan for the 4th and 10th Fukuoka districts respectively. He served as the Minister of State for Financial Services and Postal Reform from 2010 to 2012.

Honours 
 Grand Cordon of the Order of the Rising Sun (2016)

References

External links 
  

|-

|-

|-

|-

1945 births
Living people
21st-century Japanese politicians
Kyushu University alumni
Liberal Democratic Party (Japan) politicians
Members of the House of Councillors (Japan)
Members of the House of Representatives (Japan)
People from Kitakyushu
People's New Party politicians